Loddo is a surname. Notable people with the surname include: 

Alberto Loddo (born 1979), Italian road bicycle racer
 (born 1950), Italian politician, journalist, and writer
Marina Loddo (born 1959), Italian middle-distance and cross-country runner

Italian-language surnames